Dr. Rashmi Tiwari is the Founder and Director of the Aahan Tribal Foundation of India, working to dismantle the machinery of trafficking. She is Fellow of Vital Voices (USA), Fellow of SIMP and a Certified Leadership Coach from NeuroLeadership Institute.

She was one of the emerging businesswomen from India under the Fortune/US State Department Leadership Mentorship Program. She was mentored by Anne Mulcahy of the Xerox Corporation.

Early life 
Tiwari was born in 1972 in an affluent family, but later raised by single mother with no house and no source of income. She grew up in a house in Varanasi which was just 3.5 x 5.5 m.

Tiwari had to face discrimination and social stigmas. She was a posthumous child and after evicting her house in Mumbai.
 She spent a year in Kanpur with one of her aunt and then moved to Varanasi where she completed her education and earned  Ph.D degree in Economics from Banaras Hindu University which was awarded in the year 1998-99.

Career 
Tiwari was the Associate Director and then Director of American Chambers of Commerce In India (AMCHAM)]  from 2000 to 2008 and until quite recently she was spearheading the operations of associations of CEOs in CEO Clubs, India as the Executive Director. She regularly speaks on issues of women empowerment and mentoring of women at various national and international platforms.  

 Interaction with Janie Wanless, Head of Corporate Banking for Bank of America gave her courage to follow her dream and she launched Aahan Tribal Development Foundation.

Life as founder and director of Aahan Foundation 

Tiwari's Foundation - Aahan Tribal Development Foundation has been working in the Jharkhand region of India and address a string of interconnected social problems related to girls & women. These problems are: Gender Inequality, Violence Against Women (Girl Child Trafficking, Child Marriage etc.), Poverty, Lack of awareness and facilities for Health, Hygiene and Sanitation, Illiteracy.

Challenges in running Aahan Foundation 

She has been covered in the local and international media including the Washington Post for her work in the social sector with tribal girls and for mentoring & development of women leaders. However, working in the Naxalite regions and human traffickers was very difficult of Rashmi. She many a times had to face the Naxalites, traffickers and at times face the threats from local leaders or opposition from the Panchayat. 
Members of Local-Government

Awards and recognition 
 "The Good Crusader" award by Times Group for her work on anti-trafficking 
 "BIG Hero" award by Radio Channel 92.7 BIG FM 
 "Tejaswini" award by DD News
 Featured in the program "Shunya Se Shikar Tak" on Lok Sabha TV
 Vital Voices Fellow
 Global Ambassadors, Vital Voices
 Fortune emerging women business leaders from India – 2007 
 Awarded "World of Difference 100 Award" by the International Alliance For Women (TIAW) organisation of USA
 Bank of America Global Ambassador's Program 
 Vital Voices International Girls’ Empowerment Panelists 
 "Empowering The Tribal Girls of India" by Sheroes

References

Living people
Activists from Varanasi
Indian women's rights activists
Indian women activists
Women educators from Uttar Pradesh
Educators from Uttar Pradesh
20th-century Indian educators
20th-century women educators
1972 births
20th-century Indian women